450 Sutter Street, also called the Four Fifty Sutter Building, is a twenty-six-floor, 105-meter (344-foot) skyscraper in San Francisco, California, completed in 1929. The tower is known for its "Neo-Mayan" Art Deco design by architect Timothy L. Pflueger. The building's vertically faceted exterior later influenced Pietro Belluschi in his similarly faceted exterior of 555 California, the former Bank of America Center completed in 1969.

The building's tenants are largely dental and medical professional offices.

History 
In the 1960s, endocrinologist and sexologist Harry Benjamin, known for his pioneering clinical work with transgender people, opened a summer practice in the building, with many of his patients coming from the nearby Tenderloin neighbourhood.

In popular culture 
In the director's commentary of influential 3D adventure game Grim Fandango, game designer Tim Schafer credits the building as a major aesthetic influence. Schafer said he became familiar with 450 Sutter because his dentist's office was located on one of the upper floors, and that he had modeled the Department of Death, one of the game's most important locations, on the building.

Gallery

See also
San Francisco's tallest buildings

References

External links

Art Deco architecture in California
Skyscraper office buildings in San Francisco
Office buildings completed in 1929
Mayan Revival architecture
Nob Hill, San Francisco
Commercial buildings on the National Register of Historic Places in California
Historic American Buildings Survey in California
National Register of Historic Places in San Francisco
1929 establishments in California